Carlo Aurelio Widmann (Venice, 6 November 1750 – Corfu, 3 January 1798) was a Venetian patrician, naval officer, and the last  of the Venetian overseas empire, from 1794 to the Fall of the Republic of Venice in 1797.

Life 
Carlo Aurelio Widmann was born on 6 November 1650 at the parish of San Canciano in Venice. His father was Zuane Widmann and his mother was Quintilia Rezzonico, and he had an older brother and two younger ones. The  were a wealthy merchant family that had been inscribed into the Venetian patriciate in 1646, but its members had not yet held the highest offices of the Republic of Venice. In 1758, however, Carlo Aurelio's maternal uncle became Pope Clement XIII, abruptly catapulting the family to power and influence. 

Carlo Aurelio's career was the typical cursus honorum for a Venetian patrician, with naval postings alternating with administrative positions in Venice. He also served as superintendent of the Venetian Arsenal in 1791, and as inquisitor of the same two years later.

The citizens of Corfu, who had suffered under the financial exactions of his predecessor, welcomed him with enormous enthusiasm. Nevertheless, the situation on the Venetian Ionian Islands was so dismal that Widmann not only had to expend his own treasure to cover the needs of the administration, but had to petition the citizenry for funds as well, to which they responded with considerable generosity. He held the post until the Fall of the Republic of Venice in 1797, and the French occupation of the Ionian Islands in July of that year.

Works by Widmann 
 Trattato sulla mattadura della navi.
 La fortificazione universale tanto terrestre che marittima, 1768.
 La nave ben manovrata, ossia, Trattato di manovra, 1773. Republished in 1995, edited by Alvise Chiggiato
 Nuova teoria dell'arboratura delle navi.
 In Nome della Sovranità del Popolo: la Municipalità provvisoria di Venezia: Data 12. Fruttifero (29. Agosto 1797), Pinelli, Zatta, e Pasquali, Stampatori del Governo, Venice, 1797.
 Discorso apologetico scritto dal nobil uomo s. co. Carlo Aurelio Widmann provveditore generale da mar nell'isole del Veneto levante con l'aggiunta di alcune illustrazioni e documenti relativi, Venice, 1799.

References

Sources
 
 
 
 
 
 
  
  

1750 births
1798 deaths
18th-century Venetian people
Republic of Venice admirals
Venetian rule in the Ionian Islands
18th-century Venetian writers
Republic of Venice politicians
French rule in the Ionian Islands (1797–1799)